Warhammer Fantasy can mean:

Warhammer Fantasy (setting), the fictional setting of the various games and media
Warhammer (game), a table-top fantasy miniature wargame, and origin of the franchise
Warhammer Age of Sigmar, the successor game from 2015
Warhammer Fantasy Roleplay, a fantasy role-playing game

See also 
 Warhammer (disambiguation)